Moira Gemmill (18 September 1959 – 9 April 2015)  was head of design and exhibitions at the Museum of London and director of design at the Victoria and Albert Museum from 2002 until early 2015. She had recently been appointed to the job of director of capital programmes at the Royal Collection Trust. Gemmill died after being in collision with a lorry at the Millbank roundabout, near Lambeth Bridge, while cycling from her home at Kennington to her job at St James's Palace.

On 20 April 2015, pressure group Stop Killing Cyclists held a "die-in" at the site of Gemmill's death to protest the number of cyclists dying on British roads.

References

1959 births
2015 deaths
People associated with the Victoria and Albert Museum
British art curators
Alumni of the Glasgow School of Art
Road incident deaths in London